Jan Buis (born 15 February 1933) is a retired Dutch road cyclist who won a bronze medal at the 1956 World Championships. He was selected for the 1956 Olympics, but could not compete because of their boycott by the Netherlands. He has a twin brother Wim.

References 

1933 births
Living people
Dutch male cyclists
People from Haarlemmermeer
Cyclists from North Holland
20th-century Dutch people
21st-century Dutch people